The Myŏngdang Line is an electrified railway line of the Korean State Railway in P'yŏngyang and in North Hwanghae Province, North Korea, running from Ch'ŏngryong on the P'yŏngdŏk Line to Myŏngdang.

History
The Myŏngdang Line, together with Ch'ŏngryong Station, were opened by the Chosen Government Railway on 1 November 1925.

Services

In addition to freight trains serving the Sangwŏn Cement Complex and its refractories plant at Myŏngdang, there are also two pairs of local passenger trains, 702/703 and 704/705, that operate between East P'yŏngyang on the P'yŏngdŏk Line and Myŏngdang.

Route 

A yellow background in the "Distance" box indicates that section of the line is not electrified.

References

Railway lines in North Korea
Standard gauge railways in North Korea